Dr Kristina Micheva is a Bulgarian-American neuroscientist at Stanford University. She is one of the inventors of Array Tomography, a technique in which proteins are detected with antibodies in ultra-thin sections of brain tissue using confocal microscopy.

Education 
Micheva was a biology major at the University of Sofia. She received a masters in plant ecology at the University of Sofia as well. After graduation, she worked in a lab at a medical university in Sofia where she learned electron microscopy and how to work with brain sections. She moved to Montreal, Quebec to pursue a PhD in neuroscience (receiving the degree in 1996). In 1996 she participated in the  Marine Biological Laboratory Neurobiology Course, in which she later taught as faculty (2006-2014).

Research 
Micheva's main interest is in studying how brain structures develop and change with experience. During her PhD, she studied how sensory experience affects cortical development.

Invention of Array Tomography 
Micheva co-developed the Array Tomography technique with Stephen J Smith. In this technique, proteins are detected with antibodies in ultra-thin sections of brain tissue using confocal microscopy. This technique can be combined with electron microscopy and is the only technique that allows a voxel-conjugate joining of fluorescence and electron microscopy methods. Given the advantages of this method, it is considered an excellent choice for challenging explorations of cellular architectures in mature and developing tissues.

Personal life 
In her free time, Micheva practices karate. She is a third-degree black belt as of the spring of 2021, and teaches a children's karate class.

References 

Year of birth missing (living people)
Living people
Scientists from Sofia
American women neuroscientists
American neuroscientists
Sofia University alumni
Université de Montréal alumni
Stanford University School of Medicine faculty
Bulgarian women scientists
21st-century Bulgarian women